The Alvin Miller House is a Usonian home beside the Cedar River in Charles City, Iowa. It was designed by Frank Lloyd Wright and constructed over a five-year period completed in 1951. The single-story structure features a two-level flat roof which allows for clerestory windows. It was severely damaged in the flood of 2008. Restoration efforts surrounding the house after the flooding are detailed in the Alvin Miller House website.

According to the National Park Service document on the seven Iowa Usonian homes: "The third Iowa Usonian, the Alvin Miller House in Charles City, was designed in the same year as the Grant House but was not built until 1951-1952. The Miller House
was featured in Wright's 'The Natural House;' it is the smallest of the Iowa Usonians; and, unlike the Walter and Grant houses, the Miller House has a much sturdier, less radical character."

Gallery

References

 Storrer, William Allin. The Frank Lloyd Wright Companion. University Of Chicago Press, 2006,  (S.289)
 Mason City Globe Gazette, Wright Designed Home to be Restored. August 30, 2011

External links
Midcentury Modern Frank Lloyd Wright Usonian Nestled on Cedar River Bank in Iowa
Miller House on peterbeers.net
SAH Archipedia Building Entry
http://globegazette.com/news/wright-designed-home-to-be-restored/article_93223486-d389-11e0-99ef-001cc4c002e0.html

Houses completed in 1951
Frank Lloyd Wright buildings
Houses on the National Register of Historic Places in Iowa
Houses in Floyd County, Iowa
National Register of Historic Places in Floyd County, Iowa
Charles City, Iowa